The 35th FIE Fencing World Cup began in October 2005 and concluded in September 2006 at the 2006 World Fencing Championships in Turino, Italy.

Individual Épée

Individual Foil

Individual Sabre

Team Épée

Team Foil

Team Sabre

References 
 FIE rankings

Fencing World Cup
2005 in fencing
2006 in fencing
International fencing competitions hosted by Italy
2006 in Italian sport